Hokorereoro, Rangatira, or South East Island is the third largest island in the Chatham Islands archipelago, and covers an area of .

History
According to oral traditions, ancient Moriori used to travel to Rangatira by canoe to capture muttonbirds.  However, there is no material evidence of those expeditions, such as dendroglyphs (tree carvings) or petroglyphs (rock art).

European farmers ran sheep, goats and cattle on Rangatira until the 1960s when the last of these were removed.  Today the island is a gazetted nature reserve, and access to the island is restricted and controlled by the Department of Conservation.

Flora and fauna
Rangatira is host to several rare and endemic species of birds and plants, and is a sanctuary for endangered invertebrates such as the giant stick insect, coxella weevil, the flightless rove beetle Creophilus rekohuensis, and the Pitt Island longhorn beetle. It is also locally notorious for the presence of the Rangatira spider, one of New Zealand's largest spiders.

Rangatira is most famous for being the habitat for the endangered black robin, rescued from near extinction by a dedicated team led by Don Merton, who used foster parent birds to raise the chicks of black robin. The island has been identified as an Important Bird Area by BirdLife International because it supports large breeding colonies of broad-billed prions (330,000 pairs), Chatham petrels (up to 1000 pairs) and white-faced storm petrels (840,000 pairs).  Rangatira was the stronghold and last remaining breeding site for the Chatham petrel until recently; new colonies on Pitt and Chatham Islands are being established.

For a 1994 account of the birdlife of Rangatira, see Nilsson et al.

See also

 List of islands of New Zealand
 List of islands
 Desert island

References

External links
 Moriori education resources

Islands of the Chatham Islands
Uninhabited islands of New Zealand
Seabird colonies
Important Bird Areas of the Chatham Islands